Handball at the 2010 Asian Games was held in Guangzhou, Guangdong, China from November 13 to 26, 2010. In this tournament, 11 teams played in the men's competition, and 9 teams participated in the women's competition.

Schedule

Medalists

Medal table

Draw
The draw ceremony for the team sports was held on 7 October 2010 at Guangzhou. The teams were seeded based on their final ranking at the 2006 Asian Games.

Men

Group A
 (2)
 (Host)
 (6)
 (8)
 (12)

Group B
 Athletes from Kuwait (1)
 (3)
 (4)
 (7)
 (13)

Women

Group A
 (1)
 (5)
 (7)

Group B
 (3)
 (Host)
 (8)

 was later added to Group A.

Final standing

Men

Women

References

Results

External links
Handball Site of 2010 Asian Games 

 
2010
2010 Asian Games events
Asian Games
2010 Asian Games